General elections were held in Bolivia on 5 January 1947, electing both a new President of the Republic and a new National Congress.

Results

President

Vice President

Congress

References

Elections in Bolivia
Bolivia
General
Presidential elections in Bolivia
Election and referendum articles with incomplete results
January 1947 events in South America